Highbury Fields School (formerly Highbury Hill High School) is a secondary school for girls and coeducational sixth form, located next to Highbury Fields in the Highbury area of the London Borough of Islington, England.

The School has specialisms in Science and Mathematics, and is also a Leading Edge Partnership school.

Highbury Fields School offers GCSEs as programmes of study for pupils. Students in the sixth form have the option to study from a range of A Levels which are provided as part of the Islington Sixth Form Consortium (iC6).

History
The school is credited with being a successor institution to the educational ideas introduced to England by Charles and Elizabeth Mayo at the school on Grey's Inn Road.

Grammar school
It was the former Highbury Hill School, a girls' grammar school. During the war, it evacuated to Huntingdon Grammar school, now Hinchingbrooke School.

Comprehensive
It became a comprehensive in 1981. Today it is a community school administered by Islington London Borough Council.

Notable former pupils
Little Simz,  actress, rapper and singer
Kemi Adeosun former Minister of Finance Nigeria

Highbury Hill High School
 Edith Clara Batho, Principal of Royal Holloway College, University of London from 1945 to 1962
 Michelle Collins, EastEnders well-known actress, who played Cindy Beale, and Stella Price in Coronation Street
 Eileen Hickman-Smith, artist
 Mary Kerridge, actress
 Andrea Levy, novelist
 Sandy Ratcliff, EastEnders actress who played Sue Osman, expelled at the age of 12

References

External links
 

Secondary schools in the London Borough of Islington
Girls' schools in London
Community schools in the London Borough of Islington